Baek Dong-su or Baek Dong Soo (백동수, 白東脩; 1743–1816) of the Suwon Baek clan, was a swordsman and martial artist who became a folk hero when his group protected King Jeongjo from assassination attempts. His life is the basis for the Korean comic book Warrior Baek Dong-soo written by Lee Jae-hoon which was turned into a television series. Baek was one of the three authors of Muyedobotongji, a pivotal martial arts work commissioned by King Jeongjo.

Family
Great-grandfather:
Baek Si-gu (백시구, 白時耉; 1649–1722)
Grandfather:
Baek Sang-hwa (백상화, 白尙華; 1691–1768)
Father:
Baek Sa-goeng (백사굉, 白師宏; 1721–1792)
Younger brother: Baek Dong-gan (백동간, 白東侃)
Wife: Lady, of the Jinju Yu clan (부인 진주 유씨, 夫人 晉州 柳氏; 1738–1790)
1st son: Baek Sim-jin (백심진, 白心鎭)
2nd son: Baek Seong-jin (백성진, 白性鎭)

In popular culture

Film and television
Portrayed by Ji Chang-wook and Yeo Jin-goo in the 2011 SBS TV series Warrior Baek Dong-soo.
Portrayed by Oh Ji-ho in 2012 film The Grand Heist.

Literature
The 2010 comic Honorable Baek Dong-soo by Lee Jae-heon, the series is about how Joseon historical figure Baek Dong-soo grew to become a swordsman and folk hero. Baek was one of the three authors of Muyedobotongji, a pivotal martial arts work commissioned by King Jeongjo.

See also
Korean martial arts
Yi San
The Grand Heist

References

External links
SBS '무사 백동수', 월화극 시청률 정상 | 연합뉴스

18th-century Korean people
19th-century Korean people
1743 births
1816 deaths
Korean male martial artists
Swordfighters
Suwon Baek clan
Korean warriors